Guo Liang may refer to:

 Guo Liang (actor) (born 1968), Chinese-born Singaporean actor and television host
 Guo Liang (cyclist) (born 1998), Chinese cyclist
 Guo Liang (footballer) (born 1985), Chinese footballer
 Guo Liang (leader of labour movement) (1901–1928)